The women's 200-metre freestyle event at the 2000 Summer Olympics took place on 18–19 September at the Sydney International Aquatic Centre in Sydney.

Australia's overwhelming favorite Susie O'Neill, dubbed as Madame Butterfly, gave the home crowd a further reason to celebrate, as she claimed the gold medal in the event. Rocketed to the boisterous chants of "Susie, Susie" by her swimming fans, O'Neill held off a challenge from Slovakia's Martina Moravcová to strengthen her lead on the final lap before hitting the wall first in 1:58.24. Moravcova trailed behind by a small fraction of a second to capture another silver at these Games in 1:58.32, while Costa Rica's Claudia Poll, defending Olympic champion, added a second bronze to her hardware from the 400 m freestyle, in a sterling time of 1:58.81.

Russia's Nadezhda Chemezova and Germany's Kerstin Kielgass tied for fourth place in a matching time of 1:58.86, finishing off the podium by just five-hundredths of a second (0.05). Belarus' Natalya Baranovskaya pulled off a sixth-place finish in a national record of 1:59.28, while Romania's Camelia Potec (1:59.46) and China's Wang Luna (1:59.55) closed out the field.

Notable swimmers failed to reach the top 8 final, featuring world-record holder Franziska van Almsick, who faded shortly on the final lap and finished eleventh in the semi-finals; South Africa's Helene Muller, who posted a second-fastest prelims time (1:59.89) earlier but ended up only in ninth; and American duo Lindsay Benko and Rada Owen, both of whom earned a twelfth and a sixteenth spot, respectively.

Shortly after the Games, O'Neill announced her retirement from swimming, and was elected to the IOC Athletes' Commission, along with ten other athletes.

Records
Prior to this competition, the existing world and Olympic records were as follows.

Results

Heats

Semi-finals

Semi-final 1

Semi-final 2

Final

References

External links
Official Olympic Report

F
2000 in women's swimming
Women's events at the 2000 Summer Olympics